Bay High School is a public high school located in Bay Village, Ohio, west of Cleveland, Ohio.

The school colors are blue, white and red.  The sports teams are known as the Bay Rockets.  The school is a member of the Great Lakes Conference.

Notable alumni 
 Brad Friedel - soccer goalkeeper and coach
 Bob Gibbs - United States Congressman
 Patricia Heaton - actress
 David Nemec - baseball historian 
 Richard Patrick - musician
 Lili Reinhart - actress
 Joe Schriner - political activist
 Kate Voegele - musician
 Dave Zastudil - NFL punter

References

High schools in Cuyahoga County, Ohio
Bay Village, Ohio
Public high schools in Ohio